An intensive care unit (ICU), also known as an intensive therapy unit or intensive treatment unit (ITU) or critical care unit (CCU), is a special department of a hospital or health care facility that provides intensive care medicine.

Intensive care units cater to patients with severe or life-threatening illnesses and injuries, which require constant care, close supervision from life support equipment and medication in order to ensure normal bodily functions. They are staffed by highly trained physicians, nurses and respiratory therapists who specialize in caring for critically ill patients. ICUs are also distinguished from general hospital wards by a higher staff-to-patient ratio and access to advanced medical resources and equipment that is not routinely available elsewhere. Common conditions that are treated within ICUs include acute respiratory distress syndrome, septic shock, and other life-threatening conditions.

Patients may be referred directly from an emergency department or from a ward if they rapidly deteriorate, or immediately after surgery if the surgery is very invasive and the patient is at high risk of complications.

History 

In 1854, Florence Nightingale left for the Crimean War, where triage was used to separate seriously wounded soldiers from those with non-life-threatening conditions.

Until recently, it was reported that Nightingale’s method reduced mortality from 40% to 2% on the battlefield. Although this was not the case, her experiences during the war formed the foundation for her later discovery of the importance of sanitary conditions in hospitals, a critical component of intensive care.

In 1950, anesthesiologist Peter Safar established the concept of advanced life support, keeping patients sedated and ventilated in an intensive care environment. Safar is considered to be the first practitioner of intensive care medicine as a speciality.

In response to a polio epidemic (where many patients required constant ventilation and surveillance), Bjørn Aage Ibsen established the first intensive care unit globally in Copenhagen in 1953.

The first application of this idea in the United States was in 1955 by William Mosenthal, a surgeon at the Dartmouth-Hitchcock Medical Center. In the 1960s, the importance of cardiac arrhythmias as a source of morbidity and mortality in myocardial infarctions (heart attacks) was recognized. This led to the routine use of cardiac monitoring in ICUs, especially after heart attacks.

Types
Hospitals may have various specialised ICUs that cater to a specific medical requirement or patient:

Equipment and systems
Common equipment in an ICU includes mechanical ventilators to assist breathing through an endotracheal tube or a tracheostomy tube; cardiac monitors for monitoring Cardiac condition; equipment for the constant monitoring of bodily functions; a web of intravenous lines, feeding tubes, nasogastric tubes, suction pumps, drains, and catheters, syringe pumps; and a wide array of drugs to treat the primary condition(s) of hospitalization. Medically induced comas, analgesics, and induced sedation are common ICU tools needed and used to reduce pain and prevent secondary infections.

Quality of care
The available data suggests a relation between ICU volume and quality of care for mechanically ventilated patients. After adjustment for severity of illnesses, demographic variables, and characteristics of different ICUs (including staffing by intensivists), higher ICU staffing was significantly associated with lower ICU and hospital mortality rates. A ratio of 2 patients to 1 nurse is recommended for a medical ICU, which contrasts to the ratio of 4:1 or 5:1 typically seen on medical floors. This varies from country to country, though; e.g., in Australia and the United Kingdom, most ICUs are staffed on a 2:1 basis (for high-dependency patients who require closer monitoring or more intensive treatment than a hospital ward can offer) or on a 1:1 basis for patients requiring extreme intensive support and monitoring; for example, a patient on a mechanical ventilator with associated anaesthetics or sedation such as propofol, midazolam and use of strong analgesics such as morphine, fentanyl and/or remifentanil.

International guidelines recommend that every patient gets checked for delirium every day (usually twice or as much required) using a validated clinical tool. The two most widely used are the Confusion Assessment Method for the ICU (CAM-ICU) and the Intensive Care Delirium Screening Checklist (ICDSC). There are translations of these tools in over 20 languages and they are used globally in many ICU's.

Operational logistics
In the United States, up to 20% of hospital beds can be labelled as intensive-care beds; in the United Kingdom, intensive care usually will comprise only up to 2% of total beds. This high disparity is attributed to admission of patients in the UK only when considered the most severely ill.

Intensive care is an expensive healthcare service.  A recent study conducted in the United States found that hospital stays involving ICU services were 2.5 times more costly than other hospital stays.

In the United Kingdom in 2003–04, the average cost of funding an intensive care unit was:
 £838 per bed per day for a neonatal intensive care unit
 £1,702 per bed per day for a pediatric intensive care unit
 £1,328 per bed per day for an adult intensive care unit

Remote collaboration systems
Some hospitals have installed teleconferencing systems that allow doctors and nurses at a central facility (either in the same building, at a central location serving several local hospitals, or in rural locations another more urban facility) to collaborate with on-site staff and speak with patients (a form of telemedicine).  This is variously called an eICU, virtual ICU, or tele-ICU.  Remote staff typically have access to vital signs from live monitoring systems, and telectronic health records so they may have access to a broader view of a patient's medical history. Often bedside and remote staff have met in person and may rotate responsibilities.  Such systems are beneficial to intensive care units in order to ensure correct procedures are being followed for patients vulnerable to deterioration, to access vital signs remotely in order to keep patients that would have to be transferred to a larger facility if need be he/she may have demonstrated a significant decrease in stability.

See also
 ICU quality and management tools
 Intensive Care Foundation, a charity in Australia and New Zealand
 Intensive Care Medicine (journal)
 Open-source ventilator

References

Further reading

External links 

 Society of Critical Care Medicine
 ICUsteps – Intensive care patient support charity
 Organisation for Critical Care Transportation 
 
 

Intensive care medicine
Hospital departments